North Creek is an unincorporated community in Putnam County, in the U.S. state of Ohio.

History
North Creek was platted in 1879 when the Clover Leaf Railroad was extended to that point. A post office was established at North Creek in 1879, and remained in operation until it was discontinued in 1957.

References

Unincorporated communities in Putnam County, Ohio
Unincorporated communities in Ohio